Cilia van Dijk-Lieshout (born 22 November 1941, in Uden) is a Dutch film producer. Her film work includes DaDa, Frieze Frame, I Move, so I Am, The Last Words of Dutch Schultz and Anna & Bella. Anna & Bella earned her an Academy Award for Best Animated Short Film as producer.

Life and career
In 1963, Van Dijk-Lieshout married Gerrit van Dijk, a Dutch animator.

In 1978 she created Animated People, a distributor of Dutch animation films.

Filmography
1979: Jute
1983: Haast een hand
1983: A Good Turn Daily
1984: Anna & Bella (producer)
1986: Animation Has No Borders
1988: Pas à deux
1991: Frieze Frame
1995: De houten haarlemmers
1997: DaDa
1998: Ik beweeg, dus ik besta
1999: Applause
2001: Radio Umanak
2002: Stiltwalkers

See also
Børge Ring
Cinema of the Netherlands

References

External sources
 
 gerritvandijk.nl
 MUBI

Dutch film producers
People from Uden
Dutch women film producers
1941 births
Living people
Producers who won the Best Animated Short Academy Award